The Bosideng Bridge is a highway bridge over the Yangtze River in Hejiang County, Sichuan, China. The bridge carries traffic on the G93 Chengdu–Chongqing Ring Expressway.

Construction
The Bosideng Bridge is a concrete filled steel tubular arch bridge. It is the longest bridge of this design, surpassing the Wushan Yangtze Bridge.

See also
 Yangtze River bridges and tunnels
 List of largest arch bridges

References

Bridges in Sichuan
Bridges over the Yangtze River
Bridges completed in 2013
Arch bridges in China